Evening Urgant is a Russian late-night talk show hosted by Ivan Urgant on Channel One, a show based on similarly styled American late-night shows. The first episode aired on 16 April 2012. Ivan Urgant has said that he received advice from western television producers, and cites Jimmy Fallon and David Letterman as inspirations.

According to several sources, the show was suspended in February 2022 after Urgant expressed his opposition to the 2022 Russian invasion of Ukraine, which Channel One debunked by claiming that there was just a scheduling issue. As of January 2023, the program has yet to resume.

Format and structure 
Each episode begins with a cold opening, featuring jokes usually associated with the guests of the night. This is followed by the premiere of "credit sequence" with a series of night shots of Moscow, the street which is Urgant. Back in the Studio, Urgant delivers an introductory monologue containing jokes about current events, pop culture or politics. After the monologue, the show may show one or more Comedy parodies or recurring segments, after which Urgant brings out the famous guests of that evening for a one-on-one interview. The final segment of the show features a live performance from a musical guest.

The main focus of the show is on the portion containing celebrity interviews. The show's house band is The Fruits, hailing from Saint Petersburg.

Filming and airing 
The show is taped in front of a live audience at 4:30 PM MSK on the day the episode is due to be aired. Some interviews may be recorded days in advance, depending on the availability of the guest. Anyone over 16 years old can fill out an application on the show's website to be a member of the studio audience.

See also 
 Prozhektorperiskhilton
Ciao, 2020!

References

External links 
 

Channel One Russia original programming
2010s Russian television series
2012 Russian television series debuts
Russian television talk shows

Russian comedy television series